Daniel Mitwali (born 20 January 1992) is an Australian football player of Syrian descent. He is a defender who is currently playing for Altona Magic SC in the National Premier Leagues.

Reality television
In 2009, Daniel was chosen from a large pool of young footballers throughout Australia to take part in a reality television program Football Superstar to be aired on Foxtel. After proceeding through to the final 15 contestants, he was unable to win the professional contract with A-League club Melbourne Victory.

References

External links
 Profile Goal.com
  Youtube video
 

1992 births
Association football midfielders
Australian expatriate soccer players
Australian people of Syrian descent
Australian soccer players
Expatriate footballers in Indonesia
Expatriate footballers in Jordan
Liga 1 (Indonesia) players
Living people
Persiwa Wamena players
Rockdale Ilinden FC players
Syrian expatriate footballers
Syrian expatriate sportspeople in Indonesia
Syrian expatriate sportspeople in Jordan
Syrian footballers
National Premier Leagues players